Opportunity Scholarship Program may refer to:

 School voucher programs
 The D.C. Opportunity Scholarship Program, a voucher program that served approximately 2,000 students in Washington D.C.
 The Florida Opportunity Scholarship Program, a voucher program in Florida